Conor Adam Trainor (born December 5, 1989) is a Canadian rugby union player. He is from Vancouver where he started playing rugby at St. George's School.

Career
He plays in the centers or on the wing for 15s and prop for 7s rugby. Since then he has been a member of the BC age grade and men's provincial side, Western's 15s and 7s teams, Canada U20, Canada 7s and the World Cup Canada 15s program. He was part of the Canadian squad at the 2011 Rugby World Cup in New Zealand where he featured in four matches. While studying engineering at the University of Western Ontario, he played a large part in bringing the gold medal to London in 2011, thus making him an OUA champion as well. Currently he plays professional rugby in the French Ligue 2.

Sevens
In June 2021, Trainor was named to Canada's 2020 Summer Olympics team.

References

External links
 
 2011 Rugby World Cup Profile
 

1989 births
Living people
Canadian rugby union players
Rugby union centres
Rugby sevens players at the 2011 Pan American Games
Canada international rugby union players
Sportspeople from Vancouver
Commonwealth Games rugby sevens players of Canada
Canada international rugby sevens players
Rugby sevens players at the 2015 Pan American Games
Pan American Games gold medalists for Canada
Rugby Club Vannes players
Pan American Games medalists in rugby sevens
Rugby sevens players at the 2014 Commonwealth Games
Rugby sevens players at the 2010 Commonwealth Games
St. George's School (Vancouver) alumni
Medalists at the 2011 Pan American Games
Medalists at the 2015 Pan American Games
Rugby sevens players at the 2020 Summer Olympics
Olympic rugby sevens players of Canada